The action of 4 January 1781 was a minor battle of the War of American Independence. A French frigate division, departing Brest, met two British 74-gun ships of the line. The frigates tried to flee their stronger opponents, which gave chase. One of the frigates sacrificed herself to allow the others to escape.

Background 
The War of American Independence had started in 1776, increasing tension between England and France. French support for the American insurgents and British provocations against French ships finally triggered the Anglo-French War in 1778. French fleet sailed to America under Orvilliers and Estaing. In 1781, another expedition was preparing under Grasse. Frigates served as reconnaissance screens for the squadrons, but between major movements, they would often cruise independently to engage in commerce raiding.

Battle 
On 3 January 1781, a frigate division departed Brest to cruise at the entrance of the English Channel. It comprised the 32-gun frigates Fine, under Tanouarn, and Minerve, under Grimouard, as well as the lighter 26-gun Diligente and Aigrette.

In the morning of 4, in heavy weather, the division detected the British 74-gun HMS Valiant and Courageux, under Mulgrave, and the frigate tried to escape. At 1330, Courageux caught up with Minerve and engaged. Grimouard was wounded in the battle, and Lieutenant Villeneuve took over. One hour later, Valiant also engaged Minerve, which then struck her colours. After Minerve surrendered, Valiant chased Fine, which successfully escaped.

Aftermath 
Courageux had sustained serious damage to her rigging, and had change her bowsprit, foremast and mizzen to repair.

Fine went on to serve in the Indian Ocean in the squadron under Suffren.

Notes, citations, and references
Notes

Citations

References
 
 

Naval battles of the American Revolutionary War involving France
Naval battles of the American Revolutionary War
Conflicts in 1781